The National Stuttering Awareness Week is an observance in the United States for people who stutter. It was established in 1988, by a President's proclamation as the second week in May in response to the advocacy of the members of the National Stuttering Association.

References

May observances
Awareness weeks in the United States
Stuttering
Recurring events established in 1988